Phillip Price, Jr. (October 28, 1934 - February 1, 2023) was a former member of the Pennsylvania State Senate, serving from 1979 to 1982.  A lifelong Philadelphia resident, Price graduated from Harvard University and the University of Pennsylvania Law School, and began his career as an attorney at his father's law firm, Dechert LLP. 

Price was a descendent of Civil War General George Gordon Meade, 12th U.S. President Zachary Taylor and Joseph Harrison, Jr. His grandfather was Eli Kirk Price II, who was responsible for purchasing the Albert Laessle Billy goat sculpture for Rittenhouse Square.

Price supported many Philadelphia-area nonprofits and served on the boards of many organizations, including the Fairmount Park Conservancy, the Association for Public Art, the Civil War Museum of Philadelphia, The Woodlands Cemetery, The Woodlands Trust For Historic Preservation, The Ludwick Foundation, and Saint James School.

References

Republican Party Pennsylvania state senators
Living people
1934 births
Harvard College alumni
University of Pennsylvania Law School alumni